Fatost is a specialty food from northern Sweden, commonly eaten around Christmas. The recipe varies, but it usually consists of milk, rennet, syrup, sugar, wheat flour and eggs. Cinnamon and cardamom are also common.

References
 Recipe (in Swedish) on Wikibooks

See also
 Ostkaka

Swedish desserts
Christmas food
Milk dishes